The following is a list of ecoregions in Argentina defined by the World Wide Fund for Nature (WWF).

Temperate broadleaf and mixed forests
Magellanic subpolar forests
Valdivian temperate forests

Temperate grasslands, savannas, and shrublands
Argentine Espinal
Argentine Monte
Humid Pampas
Patagonian grasslands
Patagonian steppe
Semi-arid Pampas

Tropical and subtropical dry broadleaf forests
Dry Chaco

Montane grasslands and shrublands
Central Andean dry puna
Central Andean puna
High Monte
Southern Andean steppe

Tropical and subtropical grasslands, savannas, and shrublands
Arid Chaco
Córdoba montane savanna
Humid Chaco

Tropical and subtropical moist broadleaf forests
Alto Paraná Atlantic forests
Araucaria moist forests
Southern Andean Yungas

Flooded grasslands and savannas
Paraná flooded savanna
Southern Cone Mesopotamian savanna

 
Flora of Argentina
Ecoregions
Argentina